Christofer Gonzáles Crespo (born 12 October 1992) is a Peruvian professional footballer who plays for Saudi Arabian club Al-Adalah as a midfielder.

Club career

Club Universitario de Deportes
Gonzáles began his senior career with Universitario de Deportes. His league debut in the Torneo Descentralizado came on 10 March 2012 at home to Sporting Cristal, game drawn 1–1

On 9 February 2013, his scored his professional goal to Universidad César Vallejo.

He finished the Torneo Descentralizado making 42 appearances and netting six goals.

Colo-Colo
In June 2015, Gonzáles’ agent José Chacón confirmed the player's arrival to Chilean powerhouse Colo-Colo for an undisclosed fee in a two-season deal. On 7 July, he was officially presented during a press conference alongside Andrés Vilches and Martín Rodríguez.

Club Deportivo Universidad César Vallejo
In June 2016 he was hired by the Peruvian team Universidad César Valejo.

Al-Adalah
On 7 July 2022, Gonzáles joined Saudi Arabian club Al-Adalah.

International career
On 26 March 2013, he scored his first goal for Peru against Trinidad & Tobago netting the 3–0 in the first ball he touched.

International goals

Honours

Club
Club Universitario de Deportes
 U-20 Copa Libertadores: 2011
 Peruvian Primera División: 2013
Colo-Colo
Chilean Primera División (2):  2015–A, Transición 2017
Supercopa de Chile: 2017

 Sporting Cristal 

Peruvian Primera División: 2020

Copa Bicentenario: 2021

References

External links
 

1992 births
Living people
Footballers from Lima
Peruvian footballers
Peruvian expatriate footballers
Peru international footballers
Colo-Colo footballers
Club Universitario de Deportes footballers
FBC Melgar footballers
Al-Adalah FC players
Chilean Primera División players
Peruvian Primera División players
Saudi Professional League players
Association football midfielders
Expatriate footballers in Chile
Peruvian expatriate sportspeople in Saudi Arabia
Expatriate footballers in Saudi Arabia
2019 Copa América players